The whitemargin unicornfish (Naso annulatus) is a tropical fish found throughout the Indo-Pacific. It can reach a length of 100 cm, making it one of the largest members of the family Acanthuridae. The species itself exists beyond the Pakistan coast, it can be found throughout different regions of the ocean, including Hawai’i and the Red Sea

Description
Naso annulatus also known as Whitemargin unicorn fish are one of many surgeon fish in the sea.  The species normally range from a brownish-white color to grey/olive in color. They can be distinguished by the sharp cone like-shap "nasal" protruding out of their foreahead. The tail is black surrounded by a white margin. It is often found in large schools off tropical reefs, and it feeds on zooplankton. The fish has two scutes on the left side. These are found on the caudal peduncle near the tail.

Habitat and biology 
White-margin Unicorn fish can be located in the shallow parts of the ocean, such as the coral reefs. It can be found in the Red Sea, Indo-pacific ocean, and Hawai'i. It feeds on zooplankton, as well as plants like Algae. The fish has two scutes on the left side. These are found on the caudal peduncle near the tail.

References

Fish of the Red Sea
Naso (fish)
Fish of Hawaii
Fish described in 1825